Marianne Martindale (also known as Catherine Tyrell, Mari de Colwyn, Mary Scarlett and Mary Guillermin) is an English writer and columnist. As Miss Martindale, she was a prominent public face of Aristasia, an all-female subculture inspired by the Traditionalist School and early twentieth-century culture.

Activities
From 1982 to 1992 Martindale was one of the leaders of the Silver Sisterhood group based in Burtonport, County Donegal in Ireland. That group is known for creating early text adventure video games such as Bugsy and Jack the Ripper, the first game to be given an '18' rating. 

Martindale co-founded the Wildfire Club publishing house and edited a collection of stories titled Disciplined Ladies. From 2003 to 2005, Martindale wrote the Ladies' Column in The Chap magazine and was Aristasia's media representative. She discontinued this in accordance with the Bridgehead Doctrine, which discouraged Aristasians from publicly commenting on "foreign" (i.e. Earth) culture and politics.

Beliefs
Martindale received national attention in the British press in the 1990s for her advocacy of corporal punishment. Martindale's recorded statements and interviews made clear her belief in discipline as spiritual and purifying. 

Martindale always maintained that, as an Aristasian, she was neutral on matters of "Tellurian" (i.e. Earth) politics. Martindale is a royalist and imperialist, but with loyalty only to the Aristasian monarchy and empire.

Personal life 
Martindale was convicted of assault in 1993 for the caning of a young woman at St Bride's, the residence of the Silver Sisterhood. Martindale was featured in a 2022 BBC Radio Ulster podcast about St Brides, in which she describes herself as working currently as a marriage therapist in California and having adopted an adult son and two of his friends.

References

External links

Official
Aristasia Central
Aristasia Treasure Trove
The Femininity Project

Media
 Miss Martindale is interviewed by Toyah Willcox
 A Weekend at Miss Martindale's – Channel 4 documentary, aired 1996. Part I, Part II, Part III.
Interview with Miss Martindale from the time she was Aristasia's media representative.

Living people
English writers
Year of birth missing (living people)